Cormac mac Ailello (died 712) was a king of Munster from the Eóganacht Chaisil branch of the Eoganachta and the Cenél Fíngin sept of this branch. He was the grandson of Máenach mac Fíngin (died 661), a previous king. He succeeded Eterscél mac Máele Umai (died 721) in 702 who had abdicated.

The annals report that Cormac fought wars in north Munster. In 710, Cormac harried the area of Cliú (in N.E.Co.Limerick). In 712, he fought the Battle of Carn Feradaig (Cahernarry, Co. Limerick) in Cliú against the Dál gCais or Déis Tuaiscirt of Thomond. He was defeated and slain. He was succeeded by Cathal mac Finguine (died 742).

Notes

See also
Kings of Munster

References

Annals of Tigernach
Annals of Innisfallen
Francis J.Byrne, Irish Kings and High-Kings
The Chronology of the Irish Annals, Daniel P. McCarthy

External links
CELT: Corpus of Electronic Texts at University College Cork

Kings of Munster
7th-century Irish people
7th-century births
712 deaths
8th-century Irish monarchs